Corchorus cunninghamii, known as the native jute, is a rare shrub species in the family Malvaceae. It is endemic to Australia. Plants grow to 1.5 metres high and produce yellow flowers.

References

cunninghamii
Malvales of Australia
Flora of Queensland
Flora of New South Wales
Taxa named by Ferdinand von Mueller